Remarkable may refer to:
 Remarkable (stationery), a British company that makes stationery products out of recycled materials
 Remarkable (tablet), an E Ink writing tablet for reading, sketching, and note-taking